, also known as Ako Mayama (真山亜子), is a Japanese voice actress who is known for playing young boys or scruffy old ladies. She is best known for playing Sugiyama-kun in the TV series Chibi Maruko-chan.

Life
Ako Mayama is a native of Gifu prefecture and a graduate of Toyo University.

Filmography

Television animation
Mama wa Shougaku 4 Nensei (1992) as Obaasan
Hime-chan no Ribbon (1992) as Hibino Hikaru
Yu Yu Hakusho (1992) as Miyuki
Nintama Rantarou (1993) as additional roles
Red Baron (1994) as Robby (eps 5-17, 23-49)
Case Closed (1996) as additional roles
Cowboy Bebop (1998) as Pet Shop Owner
One Piece (1999) as Miss Doublefinger (eps 103-104), Kokoro, Nyon
Onegai My Melody: Sukkiri (2007) as Miss Mawari
Mononoke (2007) as Ochou's Mother
Tetsuwan Birdy Decode (2008) as Iruma
Fairy Tail (2009) as Ooba Babasaama and Ooya-san
The Tatami Galaxy (2010) as The Fortune Teller
Let's Make a Mug Too (2021) as Sachie Tokikawa

ONA
The Way of the Househusband (2021) as Elizabeth

OVA
Cyber City Oedo 808 (1990) as Kelly
Submarine 707R (2003) as Ardemis
One Punch Man: Road to Hero (2015) as Landlady

Video games
Super Robot Wars: Original Generations (2007) as Aguilla Sterne
Super Robot Wars V (2017) as Black Noir
Super Robot Wars X (2018) as Black Noir
Super Robot Wars T (2019) as Black Noir
Final Fantasy VII Remake (2020) as Mireille

Dubbing roles

Live-action
Billy Madison (Juanita)
ER (Nurse Haleh Adams (Yvette Freeman))
E.T. the Extra-Terrestrial (E.T.)
Ghostbusters (Gozer)
Ghostbusters: Afterlife (Roller Granny)
The Lord of the Rings: The Fellowship of the Ring (Lobelia Sackville-Baggins)
Minari (Soon-ja (Youn Yuh-jung))
Spaceballs (Dot Matrix)

Animation
101 Dalmatians: The Series (Mooch and Princess)
Adventure Time (Cake the Cat)
Charlotte's Web (The Goose)
Cinderella II: Dreams Come True (Beatrice)
Disney's House of Mouse (Clarabelle Cow)
Happy Feet (Mrs. Astrakhan)
Infinity Train (The Cat)
Jimmy Neutron: Boy Genius (Sheen Estevez)
Spider-Man: The Animated Series (Madame Web)
SWAT Kats: The Radical Squadron (Molly Mange)

References

External links
Profile page

Living people
1958 births
Japanese video game actresses
Japanese voice actresses
Actresses from Gifu Prefecture
20th-century Japanese actresses
21st-century Japanese actresses